Ostuh (also Romanized as Ostūh, Estooh, and Estūh; also known as Ustāf) is a village in Sang Sefid Rural District, Qareh Chay District, Khondab County, Markazi Province, Iran. At the 2006 census, its population was 2,363, in 623 families.

References 

Populated places in Khondab County